George James Ross (1 December 1877 – 27 August 1945) was a British gymnast who competed in the 1908 and 1912 Olympic Games.

As a member of the British team in 1908, he finished eighth in the team competition. He was part of the British team which won the bronze medal in the gymnastics men's team, in the European system event in 1912.

References

External links
 

1877 births
1945 deaths
British male artistic gymnasts
Gymnasts at the 1908 Summer Olympics
Gymnasts at the 1912 Summer Olympics
Olympic gymnasts of Great Britain
Olympic bronze medallists for Great Britain
Olympic medalists in gymnastics
Medalists at the 1912 Summer Olympics
20th-century British people